The Polonnaruwa period was a period in the history of Sri Lanka from 1017, after the Chola conquest of Anuradhapura and when the center of administration was moved to Polonnaruwa, to the end of the Kingdom of Polonnaruwa in 1232.

The Kingdom of Polonnaruwa was the second major Sinhalese kingdom of Sri Lanka. It lasted from 1055 under Vijayabahu I until 1212 under the rule of Lilavati. The Kingdom of Polonnaruwa came after the Anuradhapura Kingdom, which was invaded by Chola forces under Rajaraja I. It also followed the Kingdom of Ruhuna, in which the Sinhalese Kings ruled during Chola occupation.

Overview
Periodization of Sri Lanka history:

Political history

Chola conquest (1017–1056)
The Chola conquest began with the invasion in 993 AD, when Raja Raja Chola sent a large Chola army which conquered the Anuradhapura Kingdom, in the north, and added it to the Chola Empire. Most of the island was subsequently conquered and incorporated as a province of the vast Chola empire during the reign of his son Rajendra Chola.

Kingdom of Polonnaruwa (1056–1232)
Vijayabahu I (1055–1110), recaptured the whole Island and established Polonnaruwa as the new capital. King Vijayabahu married a second queen from the Kalinga (Orissa) Royal Family, and had a son, Vikramabâhu I, and a daughter, Ratnavali. His sister, Mitta, married a Pandya Prince who had three sons. His eldest son, Manabharana, married Ratnavali. Their son was Parākramabāhu I (1153–1186) Grandson of Vijayabahu I, Prince of Sinhalese-Pandyan-Kalinga descent, son of Manabharana and Vijayabahu's sister, Mitta. He was a very powerful king who was noted for his engineering, naval power, art, culture, Sinhala inscriptions, and even a Tamil edict in Uruthota (Kayts). The Chulavamsa was written by Dharmakirthi, updating the Mahavamsa to include Parakramabahu.

See also
 Mahavamsa
 Architecture of ancient Sri Lanka
 Sinhala Kingdom
 List of Sinhalese monarchs

References

Polonnaruwa period
Ancient Sri Lanka